Alfred Jordan (born February 25, 1970) is a former Canadian football cornerback for the Las Vegas Posse and Calgary Stampeders.

References

External links
Just Sports Stats

Living people
1970 births
Players of American football from Washington, D.C.
American football defensive backs
Canadian football defensive backs
African-American players of American football
African-American players of Canadian football
UCLA Bruins football players
Las Vegas Posse players
Calgary Stampeders players
21st-century African-American sportspeople
20th-century African-American sportspeople